The Lick on the Tip of an Envelope Yet to Be Sent is the debut full-length album by psychedelic folk band Circulus.

Track listing

 "Miri It Is" - 2:36
 "My Body Is Made of Sunlight" - 3:54
 "The Scarecrow" - 4:56
 "Orpheus" - 3:07
 "We Are Long Lost" - 5:34
 "Swallow" - 3:59
 "The Aphid" - 5:19
 "Candlelight" - 3:28 
 "Power to the Pixies" - 6:14

Personnel
 Michael Tyack - vocals, guitar, saz, cittern
 Lo Polidoro - vocals, harmonium
 Sam Kelly - vocals, drums
 Oliver Parfitt - keyboards, moog
 George Parfitt - bass guitar
 Victor Hugo - bongo
 Will Summers - flute, recorder, crumhorn, rausch pfiffer

Guest appearance

 Marianne Segal - vocals and guitar on "Swallow"

References

External links
 Circulus' Official Website
 Circulus on MySpace

2005 debut albums
Circulus albums
Rise Above Records albums